Quest for Camelot Dragon Games is a 1998 video game based on the Warner Bros. film Quest for Camelot and developed by Knowledge Adventure. It was released as a tie-in with the release of the film.

Gameplay and plot
This game contains a collection of mini-games for children based around the characters of the Warner Bros. animated film Quest for Camelot. 

Working Mother magazine explains, "What child wouldn't jump at the chance to raise a baby dragon? With this game, kids can give their critter a bottle, rock it to sleep, entertain it when it reaches middle childhood and supervise it during the dreaded teen years."

Critical reception
In their review of the game, SuperKids said: "Even fans of the Warner Brothers animated feature "Quest for Camelot" will be disappointed with this uninspiring software adventure. In fact, if not for the addition of a virtual pet - a charismatic dragon that the user raises from a hatchling to a self-sufficient pre-teen, the program would be a total ho-hum."

References

1998 video games
Classic Mac OS games
Video games based on films
Video games developed in the United States
Video games set in the Middle Ages
Windows games
Video games based on animated films